The women's 3000 metres steeplechase at the 2010 European Athletics Championships was held at the Estadi Olímpic Lluís Companys on 28 and 30 July.

Medalists

In the original running of the event, Marta Dominguez of Spain was awarded the silver medal, but she was disqualified and her result nullified. As a result Lyubov Kharlamova was promoted to the silver medal, and Hattie Archer, who at the time ran under her maidan name of Hattie Dean, was awarded the bronze medal, the first major women's medal for a British steeplechaser.

On 18 August 2017 Court of Arbitration for Sport (CAS) announced that Kharlamova had also been disqualified for doping offences following retesting. As a result, she too was disqualified, and her result nullified. As a result, Archer/Dean will be promoted to the silver medal, and Wioletta Frankiewicz of Poland will be promoted to the bronze medal, although reallocations have yet to be confirmed. As such, until reallocation, the silver medal position remains vacant In 2018, the reallocation was confirmed, and Hattie Archer received her medal 8 years later at the Birmingham Grand Prix.

Records

Schedule

Results

Round 1

Heat 1

Heat 2

Summary

Final

Notes: 
 Marta Domínguez was disqualified for doping offences in November 2015.
 Lyubov Kharlamova was disqualified for doping offences in August 2017.

References
 Round 1 Results
 Final Results

Steeplechase 3000
Steeplechase at the European Athletics Championships
2010 in women's athletics